The Sun Fast 36 is a French sailboat that was designed by Philippe Briand as a cruiser-racer and first built in 1994.

Production
The design was built by Jeanneau in France, starting in 1994, but it is now out of production.

Design
The Sun Fast 36 is a recreational keelboat, built predominantly of fiberglass, with wood trim. It has a fractional sloop rig, with two sets of swept spreaders and aluminum spars with stainless steel wire rigging. The hull has a nearly plumb stem, a reverse transom with steps, an internally mounted spade-type rudder controlled by a tiller and a fixed fin keel, deep draft keel or optional shoal-draft keel. It displaces  and carries  of ballast.

A  engine was optional.

The design has sleeping accommodation for six to eight people with two different interior layouts. The two cabin interior has a double "V"-berth in the bow cabin, an "U"-shaped settee and a straight settee in the main cabin and an aft cabin with a double berth on the port side. The three cabin version adds a second aft cabin on the starboard side. The galley is located on the port side just forward of the companionway ladder. The galley is "L"-shaped and is equipped with a two-burner stove, an ice box and a double sink. A navigation station is opposite the galley, on the starboard side. The head is located opposite the galley on the starboard side. On the three cabin model it is located slightly further forward.

Operational history
The boat was at one time supported by a class club that organized racing events, the Sun Fast Association.

See also
List of sailing boat types

References

External links

Photo of a Sun Fast 36

Keelboats
1990s sailboat type designs
Sailing yachts
Sailboat type designs by Philippe Briand
Sailboat types built by Jeanneau